The Sikorsky S-11  Polukroogly  (Half Round) was a Russian single engine prototype reconnaissance aircraft completed in July 1913 by the Russian Baltic Railroad Car Works while Igor Sikorsky was the chief engineer of the aircraft manufacturing division.

Design and development
It was smaller and lighter than the S-7 on which it was based, and had a conventional wooden fuselage. The cockpit featured side-by-side seating with controls for the pilot only on the left. Originally built with ailerons controlled by steel tubes inside the wings, it was later redesigned using wing warping for roll control.

Operational history
Further tests revealed limited roll authority leading to the change from ailerons to wing warping. The S-11 won second place in a reconnaissance aircraft competition hosted by the Russian military in 1913, but no orders were ever placed for additional examples.

Specifications

References

S-11
Single-engined tractor aircraft
Mid-wing aircraft
Aircraft first flown in 1913
Rotary-engined aircraft